"Not Enough Hours in the Night" is a song written by Aaron Barker, Kim Williams and Ron Harbin, and recorded by American country music artist Doug Supernaw. It was released in October 1995 as the first single from his album You Still Got Me.  It peaked at #3 in the United States, and #4 in Canada, his highest-charting song in Canada. It was his third top five hit, as well as his only top ten hit in Canada.

Music video
The music video was directed by Steven T. Miller and R. Brad Murano.

Chart positions
"Not Enough Hours in the Night" debuted at #74 on the U.S. Billboard Hot Country Singles & Tracks for the week of October 14, 1995.

Year-end charts

References

1995 songs
Doug Supernaw songs
1995 singles
Giant Records (Warner) singles
Songs written by Aaron Barker
Songs written by Ron Harbin
Songs written by Kim Williams (songwriter)
Song recordings produced by Richard Landis